Berkey v. Third Avenue Railway Co 244 N.Y. 84 (1926) is a classic veil piercing case by Judge Benjamin N. Cardozo in United States corporate law.

Facts
Minnie Berkey had an accident on a tram line operated by the Forty-second Street, etc., Railway Company. She suffered personal injury. The Third Avenue Railway owned it, along with another two corporations with street railways on different routes. Third Avenue not only owned nearly all the stock, the board of directors and executive officers were also nearly the same. Ms Berkey sued the parent, Third Avenue Railway Co, to compensate her for personal injury.

However, it was contrary to New York law at the time for one street railway company to assign its franchise to another without the Railway Commission's approval. So it was argued that a transfer in any liabilities from one to the other was an illegal contract, and therefore transfer of tort liability for Ms Berkey's personal injury was also illegal.

Judgment
The New York Court of Appeals held that the Third Avenue Railway Co was not liable for the debts of the subsidiary. The domination of the parent company over the subsidiary had to be complete for the parent company to be treated as liable for the debts of the subsidiary. It was needed that the subsidiary be merely the alter ego of the parent, or that the subsidiary be thinly capitalized, so as to perpetrate a fraud on the creditors.

Cardozo J said the following.

See also
US corporate law
Walkovszky v. Carlton, 223 N.E.2d 6 (NY 1966)
Salomon v A Salomon & Co Ltd
Adams v Cape Industries plc, two UK law cases which took a much more restricted approach
DHN Food Distributors Ltd v Tower Hamlets LBC, a less restrictive UK case by Lord Denning MR.

Notes

New York (state) state case law
United States corporate case law
1927 in United States case law
1927 in New York (state)
Streetcars in New York (state)